Johan Forsby better known by his stage name Jooks (born 5 March 1980) is a Danish rapper signed to ArtPeople label.

He started his career under the name MC Jo and gained fame through winning the DM i Rap rapping competition in 1997 in association with the rap band trio Rent mel made up of him as MC Jo, of Tegnedrengen and JernHenrik (later known as Hennesey). Johan Forsby also used at the time the name Dr. Jooks MacFive, shortening it later to Jooks.

Jooks cooperated with a number of renowned Danish rappers like L.O.C., Clemens, Jokeren, Niarn, Per Vers and rap band Suspekt.

In 2008, he had some success with "Jackmove" and "Træk vejret" and in June 2009 released his debut solo album in June 2009 was called Privilegeret and was an immediate success with the single "Hun vil ha' en rapper" topped the Tracklisten, the official Danish Singles Chart.

Jooks is married to Julia Lahme, and they have two children, Elias and Sofus.

Discography

Albums

Singles

Featured in

References

External links
Official website

Danish rappers
1980 births
Living people